The  or Armorican is an endangered French breed of domestic cattle. It originated in Brittany in the nineteenth century. It has a red coat with white markings, and has short horns.

History 

The Armoricaine was created in the nineteenth century by cross-breeding animals of the local Froment du Léon and the now-extinct Pie Rouge de Carhaix breeds with imported Durham (now known as Shorthorn) stock from the United Kingdom. A herd-book was started in 1919, and the Armoricaine breed name came into use in 1923.

The Armoricaine was used, with Meuse-Rhine-Issel and Rotbunt stock, in the creation of the Pie Rouge des Plaines dairy breed of cattle in the 1960s. In the later twentieth century it became rare; by 1978 there were no more than forty cows remaining. Following the discovery of a reserve of frozen semen in the 1980s, a programme of recovery was launched.
In 2001 there were 61 cows registered, and 10 bulls; semen from 18 bulls was preserved and available for artificial insemination. 

The breed was listed by the FAO as "critically endangered" in 2007; in 2005, the population was estimated at about 240 head, and in 2014 it was 263. In 2020 there were 301 cows on 81 farms.

Description 

The coat is red, with some white markings. The horns are short.

Use 

The Armoricaine is a dual-purpose breed, and may be raised both for meat and for milk. The young grow quickly, and mature animals fatten quickly.

References 

Cattle breeds originating in France
Cattle breeds